John Stevenson (born 1937) is a British screenwriter who, between 1976 and 2006, was a regular writer on Britain's longest-running soap opera, Coronation Street.

Career
He was originally a newspaper journalist, before transitioning into screenwriting in the late 1960s. He co-wrote the popular comedy drama, Brass with Coronation Street scriptwriter, Julian Roach in the 1980s and in 1994, the sitcom, Mother's Ruin, starring Roy Barraclough. However, this was not a ratings success and only ran to one series.

Other series has written for include The Last of the Baskets, Nearest and Dearest, How's Your Father?, The Brothers McGregor and Oh Doctor Beeching!.

He won the Special Achievement Award at the 2005 British Soap Awards.

References

External links
 

1937 births
Living people
Stevenson, John (writer)
Stevenson, John (writer)